Hafner may refer to:

Surname

Anton Hafner (born 1918), German former Luftwaffe fighter ace
Benjamin Hafner (1821–1899), American locomotive engineer 
Christian Hafner (born 1972), Italian luger
Dorinda Hafner, optician, nurse, storyteller, actress, dancer, writer, television chef
Edo Hafner (born 1955), retired Slovenian professional ice hockey player
Frank Hafner (1867–1957), Major League Baseball player
Fritz Hafner (1877–1964), Austrian-German painter and visual arts educator
Genevieve Hafner, French photographer based in New York City
Gerald Häfner (born 1956), German politician
Herta Hafner, Italian luger
Ingrid Hafner (1936–1994), British actress
Josef Hafner (1799-1891), Austrian lithographer
Josef Anton Hafner (1709–1756), German painter
Kai Häfner (born 1989), German handball player
Katie Hafner, journalist, writes books and articles about technology and society
Ludwig Hafner (1921–1942), German Luftwaffe ace
Nuala Hafner, Australian media personality
Philipp Hafner (1735–1764), Austrian farce writer
Raoul Hafner (1905–1980), Austrian-born British helicopter pioneer and engineer
Reinhard Hafner (born 1952), German footballer and coach
Sabrina Hafner (born 1984), Swiss bobsledder
Thomas Hafner, realistic and fantastic art painter
Travis Hafner (born 1977), left-handed hitting designated hitter
Wolfgang Hafner (born 1965), German jazz drummer

Other uses
Großer Hafner, a mountain in the Alps 
Grosser Hafner, Prehistoric pile dwelling settlement in Switzerland 
Kleiner Hafner, Prehistoric pile dwelling settlement in Switzerland 
Hafner Manufacturing Company, Chicago maker of clockwork-powered O gauge toy trains
Hafner A.R.III Gyroplane, British 1930s experimental autogyro
Hafner Rotabuggy, British experimental aircraft
Hafner Rotachute, British 1940s experimental one-man rotor kite
Hafner-Sarnak-McCurley constant, mathematical constant

See also
Haffner (disambiguation)
Hefner (disambiguation)
Hafer